Heteresmia is a genus of longhorn beetles of the subfamily Lamiinae, containing the following species:

 Heteresmia seabrai (Lane & Prosen, 1961)
 Heteresmia spissicornis (Fabricius, 1801)
 Heteresmia turbata (Pascoe, 1859)

References

Desmiphorini